John Conyers (1929–2019) was an American politician.

John Conyers may also refer to:

John Conyers (apothecary) (c. 1633–1694), pioneering English archaeologist
John Conyers (East Grinstead politician) (1650–1725), English Member of Parliament for East Grinstead and West Looe
John Conyers (Essex politician) (1717–1775), English Member of Parliament for Essex and Reading
John Conyers, 3rd Baron Conyers (before 1538–1557), English aristocrat
Sir John Conyers (died 1490), Knight of the Garter
 Sir John Conyers, 1st Baronet (died 1664), of the Conyers baronets
 Sir John Conyers, 3rd Baronet (1649–1719), of the Conyers baronets

See also
John Connors (disambiguation)